"Jetstream" is a song by English band New Order. Released through Warner Bros. Records on 16 May 2005, it is the second single to be taken from their eighth studio album, Waiting for the Sirens' Call (2005). The song features Scissor Sisters member Ana Matronic on additional vocals. "Jetstream" charted at number 20 in the United Kingdom and number 30 in Ireland. The music video for the song is the first to feature the band since 1993's "World (The Price of Love)".

Track listings

Charts

References

2005 singles
2005 songs
London Records singles
New Order (band) songs
Song recordings produced by Stuart Price
Songs written by Ana Matronic
Songs written by Bernard Sumner
Songs written by Peter Hook
Songs written by Phil Cunningham (rock musician)
Songs written by Stephen Morris (musician)
Songs written by Stuart Price
Warner Records singles